Thomas E. Mann (born September 10, 1944) is the W. Averell Harriman Chair and a senior fellow in Governance Studies at the Brookings Institution, a non-partisan think tank based in Washington, D.C.  He primarily studies and speaks on elections in the United States, campaign finance reform, Senate and filibuster reform, Congress, redistricting, and political polarization.

Biography
He was born in Milwaukee, Wisconsin, and attended the University of Florida, where in 1966 he received a B.A. in political science, then went on to get an M.A. (1968) and Ph.D. (1977) at the University of Michigan. He first went to Washington D.C. in 1969, where he worked as a Congressional Fellow in the offices of Senator Philip A. Hart and Representative James G. O'Hara, both Democrats.

Between 1987 and 1999, he was Director of Governance Studies at Brookings. Before that, Mann was executive director of the American Political Science Association.

Mann is a fellow of the American Academy of Arts and Sciences and a member of the Council on Foreign Relations. He is a recipient of the American Political Science Association’s Frank J. Goodnow and Charles E. Merriam Awards.

Bibliography
 Unsafe at Any Margin: Interpreting Congressional Elections (1978)
 Media Polls in American Politics, co-editor with Gary R. Orren (1992)
 Renewing Congress, with Norman J. Ornstein (1992, 1993)
 Values and Public Policy, co-editor with Henry J. Aaron and Timothy Taylor (1994)
 Congress, the Press, and the Public, co-editor with Norman J. Ornstein (1994)
 Intensive Care: How Congress Shapes Health Policy, co-editor with Norman J. Ornstein (1995)
 Campaign Finance Reform: A Sourcebook, with Anthony Corrado, Daniel R. Ortiz, Trevor Potter, and Frank J. Sorauf, eds. (1997)
 Vital Statistics on Congress, 1999-2000, with Norman J. Ornstein and Michael Malbin (1999)
 The Permanent Campaign and Its Future, co-editor with Norman J. Ornstein (2000)
 Governance for a New Century: Japanese Challenges, American Experience, co-editor with Sasaki Takeshi
 Vital Statistics on Congress, with Norman J. Ornstein and Michael J. Malbin (2002)
 Inside the Campaign Finance Battle: Court Testimony on the New Reforms, co-editor with Anthony Corrado and Trevor Potter (2003)
 The New Campaign Finance Sourcebook, co-editor with Anthony Corrado, Daniel R. Ortiz, and Trevor Potter (2003)
 The Broken Branch: How Congress Is Failing America and How to Get It Back on Track co-authored with Norman J. Ornstein (2006)
 It's Even Worse Than It Looks: How the American Constitutional System Collided With the New Politics of Extremism, with Norman J. Ornstein (Basic Books, May 2012) 
 One Nation After Trump: A Guide for the Perplexed, the Disillusioned, the Desperate, and the Not-Yet Deported, with E. J. Dionne and Norman J. Ornstein (St. Martin's Press, September 2017)

References

External links
 Thomas Mann page at Brookings
 
 Video (and audio) of conversation between Mann and Lawrence Lessig on Bloggingheads.tv

1944 births
Living people
University of Florida alumni
University of Michigan alumni
Scientists from Milwaukee
American political scientists
Fellows of the American Academy of Arts and Sciences
Brookings Institution people